Crematogaster arata is a species of ant in tribe Crematogastrini. It was described by Emery in 1906.

References

arata
Insects described in 1906